Havmor Ice Cream Company Private Limited is an Indian ice cream manufacturer. Havmor was founded in 1944, and its registered office is located in Ahmedabad, Gujarat.

History

Havmor was founded by Satish Chandra Chona as 'Have More' in 1944 in Colonial India in Karachi (now in Pakistan). Chona was an engineer who used to work for BOAC (of British Airways). After his day job he started working at his uncle’s restaurant, where he learnt to make ice-creams. After partition, he shifted to Dehradun, where he started a small shop. Later, he moved to Indore and then eventually to Gujarat. There, Chona set up the first outlet on Relief Road. In 1960s, the brand name was changed from 'Have More' to 'Havmor'.

The then Managing Director of the company, Ankit Chona, who is grandson of founder Satish Chona, told "If someone takes the business and makes it grow much faster and take it to the national level, then we are happy to look at the brand going into a such suitable hands."

Products
Havmor offers a large range of ice creams with multiple flavors and packs. The company sells more than 160 varieties of ice creams across forms.

Awards and recognition
Havmor won the 'Times Food Award' for the 'Best Ice Cream shop in Ahemdabad' awards in 2007.

Havmor Ice Cream won 'Times Food Award' for the 'Best Ice Cream' in the year 2008, 2010, 2011, 2012 and 2013.

In 2014 and 2015, Havmor won the 'Times Food Award' for the  'Best Ice Cream Shop'.

Havmor won the 'Times Food Award' for 'Best Snacks - Vegetarian' award in 2016.

In 2017, it won the 'Times Food Award' for the 'Best Ice Cream in Casual Dining'. And in 2019, it won the 'Times Food Award' for the 'Best Ice Cream Parlor - Casual Dining'.

See also

 List of ice cream brands

References

External links
 

Food and drink companies of India
Food and drink companies established in 1944
Manufacturing companies based in Ahmedabad
Fast-food chains of India
Ice cream brands
Indian companies established in 1944
Indian brands